Jules-Justin Sauveplane (1862–1928) was a French priest and historian.

Biography 
Jules-Justin Sauveplane studied at the École des langues orientales and the École pratique des Hautes Études. A specialist of Biblical studies and of the ancient East, he published one of the first French translations of the Epic of Gilgamesh (Une épopée babylonienne, 1893), in the Revue des Religions. He later supported his thesis on this topic (Sur l'épopée babylonienne de Gilgamès), under the direction of Joseph Halévy, in front of a jury including Gaston Maspero and Jules Oppert on 2 July 1894.

Main works 
1893: Une épopée babylonienne. Is-Tu-Bar - Gilgamès.
1894: Sur l'épopée babylonienne de Gilgamès.

Sources 
Revue d'histoire de l'église de France, page 433, Société d'histoire ecclésiastique de la France, v.77, no.199, 1991
Polybiblion : Revue bibliographique universelle, page 144, 1928

External links 
 Une épopée babylonienne on  Youscribe
 Jules-Justin Sauveplane on Wikisource 

1862 births
1928 deaths
19th-century French historians
20th-century French historians
École pratique des hautes études alumni
French Assyriologists
French Roman Catholic priests
Assyriologists